James S. Roantree (1835 – February 24, 1873) was a sergeant serving in the United States Marine Corps during the American Civil War who received the Medal of Honor for bravery.

Biography
Roantree was born in 1835 in Dublin, Ireland. After immigrating to the United States, he enlisted in the Marine Corps from Brooklyn on January 15, 1858. He was assigned to the Marine Detachment aboard the  when it was sent to fight in the American Civil War during the Battle of Mobile Bay. He was discharged in December 1870.

Roantree died on February 24, 1873, and was buried at New Calvary Cemetery in Mattapan, Massachusetts. His grave can be found in section 10E, row 5, grave 5.

Medal of Honor citation
Rank and organization: Sergeant, U.S. Marine Corps. Born: 1835, Dublin, Ireland. Accredited to: New York. G.O. No.: 45, 31 December 1864.

Citation:

On board the U.S.S. Oneida during action against rebel forts and gunboats and with the ram Tennessee in Mobile Bay, 5 August 1864. Despite damage to his ship and the loss of several men on board as enemy fire raked her decks and penetrated her boilers, Sgt. Roantree performed his duties with skill and courage throughout the furious battle which resulted in the surrender of the rebel ram Tennessee and in the damaging and destruction of batteries at Fort Morgan.

See also

List of American Civil War Medal of Honor recipients: Q–S

References

External links

1835 births
1873 deaths
19th-century Irish people
People from County Dublin
United States Marine Corps Medal of Honor recipients
United States Marines
Union Marines
People of New York (state) in the American Civil War
Irish-born Medal of Honor recipients
Irish emigrants to the United States (before 1923)
Burials in Massachusetts
American Civil War recipients of the Medal of Honor